Anthony Lancaster (June 25, 1938 – December 10, 2022) was a British-American Bayesian econometrician. He was the Herbert H. Goldberger Professor Emeritus at Brown University and a fellow of the Econometric Society from 1991 until his death.

Early life and education 
Lancaster was born in Eccles, Manchester, on June 25, 1938. He failed his eleven-plus, but passed at a second attempt and spent the next four years at the bottom of the C stream at King George V Grammar School, Southport. He gained a first class honours in economics from the University of Liverpool in 1959. He was awarded a State Studentship and moved to St Catharine's College, Cambridge, where he earned a doctorate in economics under M.J. Farrell.

Career 
In 1963–64 Lancaster finished his PhD dissertation as a research fellow at the Economic and Social Research Institute, Dublin,  and in 1964 he was hired at the University of Birmingham. In 1973 he moved to Hull University as a professor and became department chair. In 1986 he was hired by Brown University in Providence, Rhode Island, USA. He served as department chair at Brown and retired in 2006. While at Brown he worked in health economics and was a member of the Department of Community Health in addition to the Economics department. Among the students whose graduate work he supervised were Nobel laureate Guido Imbens, Wilbert Van der Klaauw, Orna Intrator, Tieman Woutersen and Peter Hansen.

Lancaster was an international fellow at the Centre for Microdata Methods and Practice at University College London.

Personal life and death 
Lancaster married Jane Heawood in 1967; the couple had two sons, and a daughter from a first marriage.  

Lancaster died in Providence, Rhode Island, on December 10, 2022, at the age of 84.

Publications

External links 
Anthony Lancaster
Bringing hard science to economics

References 

1938 births
2022 deaths
People from Eccles, Greater Manchester
20th-century American economists
21st-century American economists
British economists
British emigrants to the United States
Alumni of St Catharine's College, Cambridge
Fellows of the Econometric Society
Academics of the University of Hull
Academics of the University of Birmingham
Brown University faculty
Alumni of the University of Liverpool